Lauryn Chandler is an American author of contemporary romance novels.  She has also written under the pseudonym Wendy Warren.

Chandler has twice been the recipient of the highest honor given to romance novelists, the Romance Writers of America's RITA Award. Both of her wins came in the category Best Traditional Romance, in 1997 for her novel Her Very Own Husband and in 1995 for Oh, Baby!'''.  She has also been twice nominated for Romantic Times Reviewers' Choice Awards.

Bibliography

As Lauryn ChandlerMr. Wright (1993)Romantics Anonymous (1993)Oh, Baby! (1994)Her Very Own Husband (1996)Just Say I Do (1997)The Drifter's Gift (1997)

As Wendy WarrenDakota Bride (2002)The Oldest Virgin in Oakdale (2002)Making Babies (2005)Undercover Nanny (2005)The Boss and Miss Baxter (2006)Once More, at Midnight (2007)The Baby Bargain (2007)

OmnibusWanted: One Father / Making Babies (2005) (with Penny Richards)Other Side of Paradise / Undercover Nanny'' (2005) (with Laurie Paige)

References

20th-century American novelists
21st-century American novelists
American romantic fiction writers
American women novelists
Living people
RITA Award winners
20th-century American women writers
21st-century American women writers
Year of birth missing (living people)
Pseudonymous women writers
20th-century pseudonymous writers
21st-century pseudonymous writers